Richard Ciamarra (born November 13, 1998) is an American tennis player.

Ciamarra made his ATP main draw debut at the 2022 Hall of Fame Open after receiving a wildcard into the doubles main draw. He received this wildcard by winning the 2022 NCAA doubles title with Cleeve Harper.

Ciamarra played college tennis at University of Notre Dame before transferring to the University of Texas at Austin.

References

External links

1998 births
Living people
American male tennis players
People from Pelham, New York
Texas Longhorns men's tennis players
Notre Dame Fighting Irish men's tennis players
Tennis people from New York (state)